Kenneth Gene "The Tall Texan" Jackson (April 26, 1929January 28, 1998) was an American football offensive lineman in the National Football League. A native of Austin, Texas, Jackson played for six seasons for the Dallas Texans and the Baltimore Colts.

Hall of Famer Art Donovan was Jackson's teammate on the Colts and shared this anecdote: "Jackson had this fight with Big Daddy [Lipscomb] up in training camp.  Actually it wasn't really a fight.  Big Daddy took a sucker shot at Jackson and decked him.  By the time Jackson scrambled back up into the fray, there were people already breaking it up, so Jackson never really got any licks in.  But he turned to Big Daddy and said, 'I'm gonna get you, you dirty bastard.  You're dead meat.'  No one doubted that he meant it.

"Every year the Colts would play an intrasquad exhibition game for the benefit of various Baltimore charities—the Boys' Club and whatnot—and sixty-two thousand fans would fill Memorial Stadium.  So the 1957 game was perhaps three weeks after the fight, and nothing had happened between Big Daddy and Jackson.  Then, right in the middle of the game, Jackson did it.  He butted Big Daddy—broke his face mask, shattered his nose, and knocked a couple of teeth out.  They dragged Big Daddy off the field unconscious.  And when he woke up on the bench, he began mumbling, 'I'm gonna kill that Texas bastard.  I'm gonna go back in there and kill him.'

"Jackson heard about it, went over to Big Daddy on the sideline, and told him, 'I hope you come back in for more.  Cause I ain't through with you yet.  I'm gonna murder you.'  And he had this gleam in his eyes that really shook Big Daddy.  Hell, it shook me, too.  We went up to Big Daddy and told him, 'Gene, stay away from that guy.  He will kill you.'  And from that day on, Big Daddy avoided the Tall Texan like the plague.  Jackson was a crazy bastard."

References

1929 births
1998 deaths
Players of American football from Austin, Texas
American football offensive tackles
American football offensive guards
Texas Longhorns football players
Dallas Texans (NFL) players
Baltimore Colts players